Cristian Stănescu (born 13 October 1951) is a Romanian politician and Member of the European Parliament. Stănescu is a member of the Greater Romania Party and was a part of the Identity, Tradition, Sovereignty group. He became an MEP on 1 January 2007 with the accession of Romania to the European Union. Stănescu  resides in Brașov, Romania with his wife and son.

External links
European Parliament profile

1951 births
Living people
Greater Romania Party politicians
Greater Romania Party MEPs
MEPs for Romania 2007